"Fred Come to Bed" is a song recorded by German eurodance act E-Rotic. It was released in March 1995 as the second single from the album Sex Affairs. Written and composed by David Brandes and John O'Flynn, the song hit success in German-speaking countries where it was a top ten hit. In Germany, the song was ranked for 18 weeks and was a top three hit. In Switzerland, it hit number six and remained in the top 50 for 16 weeks. In Austria, it fell off the top 30 after 14 weeks and a peak at number five. In France and Belgium (Flanders), the song was a top 20 hit, and in December 1995 the song reached number 90 in the United Kingdom.

On 15 September 2006, Eurodance group Shanadoo released a cover version in the Japanese language under the title "My Samurai" (Germany), achieving moderate success in some European countries.

The fantasy remix is included in the Sex Affairs album. The song also appeared on E-Rotic's compilations Greatest Tits (The Best of) and Dancemania presents E-ROTIC Megamix.

Music video
The music video for "Fred Come to Bed" was directed by Zoran Bihać.

Track listings

 CD maxi - Europe
 "Fred Come to Bed" (radio edit) — 3:56  	
 "Fred Come to Bed" (extended version) — 5:14 	
 "Fred Come to Bed" (the Bed Fred remix) — 5:08 	
 "Fred Come to Bed" (the Groaning E-Rotic remix) — 4:54 	
 "Fred Come to Bed" (instrumental version) — 3:56

 CD maxi - UK
 "Fred Come to Bed" (radio edit) — 3:56  	
 "Fred Come to Bed" (the techno remix) — 5:08 	
 "Fred Come to Bed" (the Groaning E-Rotic remix) — 4:54 	
 "Fred Come to Bed" (the fantasy remix) — 5:46 	
 "Fred Come to Bed" (the trance remix) — 5:07

 12" maxi - Europe
 "Fred Come to Bed" (extended version) — 5:14  	
 "Fred Come to Bed" (the Bed Fred remix) — 5:08 	
 "Fred Come to Bed" (the Groaning E-rotic remix) — 4:54

 12" maxi - UK
 "Fred Come to Bed" (the techno remix) — 5:08  	
 "Fred Come to Bed" (the Groaning E-Rotic remix) — 4:54 	
 "Fred Come to Bed" (the fantasy remix) — 5:46 	
 "Fred Come to Bed" (the trance remix) — 5:07

 CD single - France
 "Fred Come to Bed" (radio edit) — 3:56  	
 "Fred Come to Bed" (extended version) — 5:14

 CD single, 12" maxi - Remixes
 "Fred Come to Bed" (dance the Fred) — 5:46  	
 "Fred Come to Bed" (trance the Fred) — 5:07 	
 "Fred Come to Bed" (the original Fred) — 3:57

Credits
 Cover artwork by I-D Büro
 Illustration by Zoran
 Produced by David Brandes, Domenico Livrano and Felix J. Gauder
 Recorded and mixed at Bros Studios, Germany
 Published by Cosima Music/Edition Birdie

Charts and certifications

Weekly charts

1 E-Rotic version
2 Shanadoo version

Year-end charts

Certifications

References

1995 singles
2006 singles
Animated music videos
Blow Up singles
E-Rotic songs
English-language German songs
Songs written by Bernd Meinunger
Songs written by David Brandes